Gabriel Rzączyński (6 July 1664 – 12 November 1737) was a Polish Jesuit, naturalist, geographer, and writer. He published several works in Latin on the natural history of Poland.

Rzączyński was born in Podlasie, from a family bearing the Ślepowron coat of arms, and joined the Jesuit order in 1682 and became a grammar teacher from 1687 at Lublin. In 1692 he taught theology at Kraków, still later rhetoric and philosophy at Toruń, Lublin and Poznań, and Łuck. After 1717 he became a prefect of Gdańsk schools and from 1721 rector at Ostrog. Following his wide travels he wrote on the curiosities of natural history in his Historia naturalis curiosa Regni Poloniae, Magni Ducatus Lithuaniae XX divisa (1721). In 1736 he published Auctuarium historiae naturalis. Aside from fauna, flora and geography, he wrote on contemporary myths and beliefs. In his 1721 work, he included descriptions of beliefs in vampires and walking corpses.

References

External links 
 Historia Naturalis Curiosa Regni Poloniae (1721)
 Auctuarium Historiae Naturalis Curiosae Regni Poloniae Magni Ducatus Litvaniae, Annexarumque Provinciarum (1745)

1664 births
1737 deaths
Polish naturalists
Jesuits